Joseph Yost may refer to:

 Joseph W. Yost (1847–1923), American architect
 Joseph R. Yost (born 1986), American politician